The Isle Galet Formation is a formation cropping out in Newfoundland.

References

Ordovician Newfoundland and Labrador